Were is the surname of the following people:
 Beatrice Were (born c.1966), Ugandan AIDS activist
 David Were, Kenyan politician
Gideon Were (1934–1995), Kenyan historian, author, publisher, administrator and entrepreneur
 Edward Were, 19th-century Anglican bishop
Jesse Were (born 1989), Kenyan football player
Jonathan Binns Were (1809–1885), Australian politician
Mary Esther Were, Kenyan beauty pageant titleholder
 Miriam Were (born 1940), Kenyan academic and public health advocate
 Mugabe Were (1968–2008), Kenyan legislator
Paul Were (born 1991), Kenyan football player
Robert Were Fox the Younger (1789–1877), British geologist, natural philosopher and inventor
Robert Were Fox the Elder (1754–1818), English Quaker businessman